South Beach Casino & Resort, often simply referred to as South Beach, is a casino hotel located in Scanterbury, Manitoba, and is one of three First Nation-owned casinos in the province. It is situated on Manitoba Highway 59, or one hour, northeast of Winnipeg.

It began operating on 28 May 2005, and is owned by the 7 Manitoba First Nations of the Southeast Resource Development Council Corp tribal council.

Ownership and management

South Beach is owned by seven Manitoba First Nations that fall under the umbrella of the Southeast Resource Development Council Corp: Black River First Nation, Bloodvein First Nation, Brokenhead Ojibway Nation, Hollow Water First Nation, Little Grand Rapids First Nation, Pauingassi First Nation, and Poplar River First Nation.

The community of Scanterbury itself falls within the boundaries of Brokenhead 4, the main reserve of Brokenhead Ojibway Nation.

South Beach was developed by a Minnesota-based company called Hemisphere Gaming, with whom the casino has a management agreement with until 2028.

The seven First Nations collectively sought out a loan to help fund and build the casino and resort. This was considered a high-risk venture and no one was willing to assist in its development. Hemisphere was the only company that was willing to fund and help build South Beach Casino and Resort.

Casino

It is a smoke-free environment. It operates 600 slot machines, blackjack tables, and other gambling tables.

Resort

The resort portion of South Beach is in operation 365 days a year. It is fashioned in an Art-Deco design and tropical motif featuring a range of rooms which go from standard or deluxe rooms all the way to "grand" suites. It features a "tropical" pool and cascading "waterfall", various ball/convention rooms, a restaurant, and a lounge featuring live entertainment.

See also
 List of casinos in Canada

References

External links
Official site

Southeast Resource Development Council
Casinos in Manitoba
Hotels in Manitoba
Hotels established in 2005
2005 establishments in Manitoba
Casinos completed in 2005
Casino hotels